The 2003–04 Ligat Nashim was to be the sixth season of women's league football under the Israeli Football Association. However, the league was interrupted after the clubs went on strike in protest over discrimination in budget allocation and financial difficulties. and although the league resumed after a month of strike, eventually the league was abandoned.

The season is also noticeable due to the inclusion of Ironi Ariel, who lost all of its matches without scoring a goal. The team worst defeat came of the hands of Maccabi Holon, 0–48 (initially given as a 0–50 loss), with striker Silvi Jan scoring 15 goals. The club also registered a 0–32 loss to ASA Tel Aviv University, with Meital Dayan scoring 17 goals.

League table
The league was abandoned after playing the 11th round, which was due to be the last before the play-offs, involving the top 6 teams. At the time of abandonment, 6 regular season matches were still due to be completed.

References
 Women's League 2004 Women's Football in Israel 

Ligat Nashim seasons
1
women
Israel